The women's lyonnaise progressive competition in boules sports at the 2017 World Games took place on 22 July 2017 at the Centennial Hall in Wrocław, Poland.

Competition format
A total of 8 athletes entered the competition. Due to heavy rain after qualifications rest of the competition was cancelled. Qualification results has been recognized as final results.

Results

Qualification

References 

 
2017 World Games